is a Japanese voice actor who currently works for Sigma Seven. He is best known as the voice of Reks in the original Japanese version of Final Fantasy XII and Duelo McFile in Vandread.

Notable voice roles

Anime television
Blood+ - Gestas
Diamond Daydreams - Tezuk
Gravion
RahXephon - Masaru Gomi
Sgt. Frog - Megaton
SoltyRei - Larry Anderson
Stratos 4 - Tsubasa Miyazawa
Vandread series - Duelo McFile
Skull Man - Tetsurou Shingyouji
Persona -trinity soul- - Takurō Sakakiba

OVA
Yotsunoha - Makoto Yūki
Hanayaka Nari, Waga Ichizoku: Kinetograph - Isami Miyanomori

Video game
Final Fantasy XII - Reks
True Tears - Keigo Sakuragawa

Tokusatsu
Kamen Rider × Kamen Rider Wizard & Fourze: Movie War Ultimatum – Other Kamen Riders (Voice of Atsushi Tamaru and Junji Majima)

Drama CDs
Aisaresugite Kodoku series 2: Itoshisugita Shifuku - Waiter
Happy Time - Nanao Kojima

References

External links
 
 
Sigma Seven entry (in Japanese)

1975 births
Living people
Japanese male voice actors
Male voice actors from Shizuoka Prefecture
21st-century Japanese male actors
Sigma Seven voice actors